The , referred to from here on as "Kōhaku," aired on December 31, 2007, on NHK Hall in Japan. 

The music show on New Year's Eve is broadcast on both television and radio, and divides the most popular music artists of the year into competing teams of red and white.  Air time was from 19:20 to 23:45 (with an interruption from 21:25 to 21:30 for news). All times are JST.

Chairpersons 
Red team host: Masahiro Nakai
White team host: Tsurube Shōfukutei
Mediators: Kazuya Matsumoto and Miki Sumiyoshi
Radio announcers: Sen Odagiri and Ai Tsukahara

Performance listing

Results 
The winners were the shirogumi, the white team, which was revealed by illuminating the darkened Tokyo Tower in blue-white light.

Viewing percentages in the Kantō region were 32.8% for the first section and 39.5% for the second.

Judges
 Aoi Miyazaki
 Momoko Ueda
 Hideki Okajima
 Isao Aoki
 Nakamura Kanzaburō XVIII
 Yui Aragaki
 Ken Mogi
 Mariko Bando
 Tomonori Jinnai

External links 
58th NHK Kōhaku Uta Gassen performer and song list in Japanese

References

NHK Kōhaku Uta Gassen events
NHK
K